Mbola is a village in the Bokito commune of the Centre Province of Cameroon. 
It is home to a small number of people who speak the Mbole language.
As of 2007, there were just 100 speakers of this languages, none of whom were monolingual.

References

Populated places in Centre Region (Cameroon)